Man Blowing on an Ember is an undated work by Dutch artist Matthias Stom, one of several he produced on Sicily. It represents a man, with a turban, blowing on a ember. The composition is totally in the chiaroscuro style and it doesn't give any evidence about his setting. The painting was recorded in the Ruffo collection in Messina, it is now held in the Palazzo Abatellis, in Palermo.

References

Paintings in Palazzo Abatellis
Paintings by Matthias Stom
Genre paintings
17th-century paintings